The following is a list of works about Amsterdam, Netherlands.

List of works, arranged by author

Cotterell, Geoffrey. Amsterdam: The Life of a City (1972)
de Waard, M., ed. Imagining Global Amsterdam: History, Culture, and Geography in a World City. Amsterdam: Amsterdam University Press 2013.
Feddes, Fred. A Millenium of Amsterdam: Spatial History of a Marvelous City. Bussum: Thoth 2012. 
 Lindemann, Mary. The Merchant Republics: Amsterdam, Antwerp, and Hamburg, 1648-1790 (Cambridge University Press, 2014) 356 pp.
 Regin, Derek. Traders, artists, burghers: A cultural history of Amsterdam in the 17th century  (1976)
 Roekholt, Richter. A short history of Amsterdam (2004)
Shorto, Russell. Amsterdam: A History of the World's Most Liberal City. New York: Vintage Books 2014.

List of works, arranged chronologically

Published in the 17th-18th centuries
in English
 
 

in Dutch

Published in the 19th century
in English
 
 
 
 
 
 
 
 
 
 
 
 
 
 
 

in other languages
  (Contents)
  
 v.1 to 1350
 v.2 1350-1555
 v.3 1555-1578
 v.4 1578-1713
 v.5 1713-1795
 v.6 1795-1813
 v.7 1813-ca.1879

Published in the 20th century
in English
 
 
 
 
 
 
 
 
 
 
 
 
 

in other languages

Published in the 21st century

Bibliographies

See also
 History of Amsterdam

Amsterdam
Amsterdam-related lists
History of Amsterdam